Joseph Chennoth (13 October 1943 – 8 September 2020) was a Syro Malabar Catholic prelate who worked in the diplomatic service of the Holy See. He was an archbishop and an apostolic nuncio since 1999.

He was ordained a priest on 4 May 1969 by Bishop Paul Ch’eng Shih-kuang of Tainan, Taiwan.

He prepared for a diplomatic career by completing the course of study at the Pontifical Ecclesiastical Academy in 1973.

Pope John Paul II named him titular archbishop of Milevum and Apostolic Nuncio to the Central African Republic and Chad on 24 August 1999. He received his episcopal consecration on 30 October from Cardinal Angelo Sodano.

Pope Benedict XVI named him Apostolic Nuncio to Tanzania and on 15 June 2005.

Benedict appointed him Apostolic Nuncio to Japan on 15 August 2011.

In 2018, he gave a supportive message to the March for Life in Tokyo.

He died in Tokyo on 8 September 2020.

References

External links

 

1943 births
2020 deaths
Malayali people
People from Alappuzha district
Indian diplomats
Syro-Malabar Catholic Archbishops of Ernakulam-Angamaly
Syro-Malabar archbishops
Apostolic Nuncios to the Central African Republic
Apostolic Nuncios to Chad
Apostolic Nuncios to Japan
Apostolic Nuncios to Tanzania
Pontifical Ecclesiastical Academy alumni